The 2008 Moorilla Hobart International was a women's tennis tournament played on outdoor hard courts. It was the 15th edition of the Moorilla Hobart International, and was part of the Tier IV Series of the 2008 WTA Tour. It took place at the Hobart International Tennis Centre in Hobart, Australia, from 6 through 11 January 2008.

Champions

Singles

 Eleni Daniilidou defeated  Vera Zvonareva, walkover
It was Eleni Daniilidou's 1st title of the year, and her 5th overall.

Doubles

 Anabel Medina Garrigues /  Virginia Ruano Pascual defeated  Eleni Daniilidou /  Jasmin Wöhr, 6–2, 6–4

External links
Official website
Singles, Doubles and Qualifying Singles Draws

 
Moorilla Hobart International
Moorilla Hobart International
Hobart International